The Women's FA Challenge Cup Competition is the top annual cup tournament for women's clubs in English football. Founded in 1970, it has been named the WFA Cup, FA Women's Cup and now Women's FA Cup (Vitality Women's FA Cup for sponsorship reasons).

Designed as an equivalent to the FA Cup in men's football, the competition began in 1970–71 as the Mitre Challenge Trophy, organised by the Women's Football Association (WFA). There were 71 entrants, including teams from Scotland and Wales.

The WFA ran the competition for the first 23 editions, during which time Southampton Women's won the cup eight times. The Football Association (FA) began administrating English women's football in mid-1993.

Arsenal holds the record for most titles overall, having won fourteen times. The current cup holders are Chelsea, who defeated Manchester City 3–2 in the final at Wembley Stadium on 15 May 2022, winning them back-to-back FA Cup finals in front of 49,094 fans, a record in the competition.

Name 

The competition, founded in 1970, was sponsored as the Mitre Challenge Trophy until April 1976.

As a Women's Football Association competition until 1992–93, it was known as the WFA Cup or more informally as the Women's FA Cup. After the running of the competition passed to the FA in 1993–94, the Association renamed it as the FA Women's Cup, until 2015. The name was officially reworded as the Women's FA Cup in June 2015, prior to that year's final. The tournament rules, as in the men's FA Cup, name it the Challenge Cup Competition.

History 
Previous national cup competitions included the English Ladies Football Association Challenge Cup in 1922, won by Stoke Ladies.

The first women's Mitre Challenge Trophy matches were played in 1970, and the first final was held on 9 May 1971 at Crystal Palace National Sports Centre. The WFA was initially named the Ladies Football Association of Great Britain, and Scottish clubs were successful in reaching the first three finals of this tournament (albeit as runners-up). Two of these clubs were runners-up in England while also winning the Scottish Women's Cup in the same season, Stewarton Thistle in 1971 and Westthorn United in 1973.

Southampton Women's F.C. won eight of the first 11 WFA Cup competitions.

Doncaster Belles reached nearly every final between 1982–83 and 1993–94, and won the trophy six times.

Format 
The current entry points as of the 2019–20 season:

 the Second Qualifying round for FA Women's National League Division One teams (47 teams)
 the Second Round Proper for FA Women's National League North & South Premier Division teams (24 teams)
 the Fourth Round Proper for FA WSL and FA Women's Championship teams (33 teams)

All other clubs in the fifth tier or below are drawn to either play in the Extra Preliminary Round or have a bye to the Preliminary Round. After the initial preliminary rounds, there are three qualifying rounds before the First Round Proper. All rounds until the FA WSL and Championship teams enter in the Fourth Round are played on a geographical basis (north and south regions).

Trophies 
The original Mitre Challenge Trophy has "disappeared", according to the WFA History records. This cup was replaced in May 1979 when the Football Association donated a new trophy for the competition's winners, to mark the WFA's tenth anniversary.

1970–71 cup winner Sue Lopez said it was suspected that a player "tucked it away somewhere in a trophy cabinet", and she was trying to locate the original cup for the National Football Museum in 2015.

The current Women's FA Cup trophy was one of the first prestigious trophies to be made in the Thomas Lyte silver workshop.

List of finals
The following is a list of Women's FA Cup seasons and Final results.

Where a season's Final is marked in bold, it has a specific article for the match.

Finalists by club

The Cup winner competed against the FA Women's Premier League National Division champions in the annual FA Women's Community Shield match from 2000 until 2008, and against the FA WSL winners since 2020.

Media coverage
In the late 1980s and early 1990s, television coverage of the WFA final was provided by Channel 4.

Between 2001 and 2008, the final of the tournament was covered by BBC TV, presented by Celina Hinchcliffe, Rebecca Lowe, Ray Stubbs and Jake Humphrey; the punditry team was usually current players like Sue Scott and commentary usually by Steve Wilson and Lucy Ward or Faye White and always played on May Day Bank Holiday. The final was also simulcast on BBC Radio Five Live. In 2009, the final was moved to ITV1 with commentary from Jon Champion and Lucy Ward. Sky Sports secured a three-year deal for live coverage from 2010 until 2012.

Sponsorship
Sponsors of the original WFA competition (1970–1993) included Mitre, Pony wines and Mycil.

In the FA competition, the sponsors have been UK Living (1995–1998), AXA (1998–2002), Nationwide Building Society (2002–2006) and E.ON (2006–2011). From 2007, Tesco obtained additional branding and advertising rights through their partnership agreement with the FA.

Despite sponsorship by these major companies, entering the tournament has actually cost clubs more than they often get in prize money. In 2015 it was reported that even if Notts County had won the tournament outright the paltry £8,600 winnings would leave them out of pocket. The winners of the men's FA Cup in the same year received £1.8 million, with teams not even reaching the first round proper getting more than the women's winners.
In September 2020, the FA announced that health and life insurance and investment company VitalityHealth have signed a deal to become the sponsor of the competition until July 2023.

Notes

See also
FA Women's National League Cup
FA Women's League Cup
List of women's association football clubs

References

External links
 

 
England
Women's football competitions in England
Recurring sporting events established in 1970
1970 establishments in England